Naval Air Station Lemoore or NAS Lemoore  is a United States Navy base, located in Kings County and Fresno County, California, United States. Lemoore Station, a census-designated place, is located inside the base's borders.

NAS Lemoore is the Navy's newest and largest master jet base. Strike Fighter Wing Pacific, along with its associated squadrons, is home ported there.

NAS Lemoore also hosts five carrier air wings: Carrier Air Wing Two (CVW-2), Carrier Air Wing 5 (CVW-5), Carrier Air Wing Nine (CVW-9), Carrier Air Wing Eleven (CVW-11), and Carrier Air Wing Seventeen (CVW-17).

History
Commissioned in 1961, NAS Lemoore, as seen from an aircraft flying above, looks significant and stands out from the farmlands of Central California, due to its large construction. It is the newest and largest master jet base of the U.S. Navy. Aircraft parking and maintenance hangars are aligned between the  runways. Separated from the hangars by underpasses beneath taxiways A and C, the remainder of the air operations area is located directly to the southeast.

In July 1998, NAS Lemoore was selected as the West Coast site for the Navy's newest strike-fighter aircraft, the F/A-18E/F Super Hornet. This decision brought approximately 92 additional aircraft, 1,850 additional active duty personnel and 3,000 family members to NAS Lemoore, and several associated facility additions or improvements.

The Navy also brought four new fleet squadrons to NAS Lemoore from 2001 to 2004. Additional military staffing was required at the Aircraft Intermediate Maintenance Department, Strike Fighter Weapons School Pacific, and Center for Naval Aviation Technical Training Unit Lemoore (CNATTU Lemoore) to support this effort. Originally, the officer in charge of construction for building the base was Commander Dennis K. Culp CEC/USN, the first Naval officer in Lemoore.

On 31 March 2016, two civilians were killed when the Jeep Grand Cherokee they were driving in collided with a parked F/A-18 jet. They were being pursued by the California Highway Patrol (CHP) and managed to enter the base without hindrance by base security. A CHP helicopter was monitoring the chase from above and captured the event in a FLIR video; the base tower staff can be heard asking if the vehicle was already in the base. A CHP dispatcher can be heard confirming so and that CHP were unable to contact base security for assistance.

Current operations
With the transfer of NAS Miramar to the United States Marine Corps, NAS Lemoore now hosts the Navy's entire west coast fighter/attack capability. NAS Lemoore was built "from the ground up" as a Master Jet Base, and has several operational advantages, and relatively few constraints, as a result.

Strike Fighter Wing Pacific with its supporting facilities is home ported here. The primary aircraft based at NAS Lemoore is the F/A-18 Super Hornet strike fighter. In November, 1999, NAS Lemoore received its first F/A-18E/F Super Hornets, which replaced the F-14 Tomcat in fleet service as an air-superiority fighter and has assumed, in a different configuration, the role of older F/A-18 Hornet fighters. Currently, there are a total of 175 Hornets and Super Hornets home-based at NAS Lemoore operating from one  Fleet Replacement Squadron and sixteen Fleet [operational] Squadrons. In 2017, the F-35C Lightning II was received onboard NAS Lemoore, establishing the first F-35 Pacific training squadron.

Lemoore is home to aircraft assigned to the following Carrier Air Wings.

Carrier Air Wing 2 (CVW-2), assigned to 
Carrier Air Wing 5 (CVW-5), forward deployed to MCAS Iwakuni, Japan; assigned to 
Carrier Air Wing 9 (CVW-9), assigned to 
Carrier Air Wing 11 (CVW-11), assigned to 
Carrier Air Wing 17 (CVW-17), assigned to

Based flying units 
Flying units based at NAS Lemoore.

United States Navy 
Commander, Naval Air Forces, Pacific

 Air Operations Department – MH-60S Seahawk
 Joint Strike Fighter Wing
 Strike Fighter Squadron 97 (VFA-97) – F-35C Lightning II
 Strike Fighter Squadron 125 (VFA-125) – F-35C Lightning II
 Strike Fighter Squadron 147 (VFA-147) – F-35C Lightning II
 Strike Fighter Wing Pacific
 Strike Fighter Squadron 2 (VFA-2) – F/A-18F Super Hornet
 Strike Fighter Squadron 14 (VFA-14) – F/A-18E Super Hornet
 Strike Fighter Squadron 22 (VFA-22) – F/A-18F Super Hornet
 Strike Fighter Squadron 25 (VFA-25) – F/A-18E Super Hornet
 Strike Fighter Squadron 41 (VFA-41) – F/A-18F Super Hornet
 Strike Fighter Squadron 86 (VFA-86) – F/A-18E Super Hornet
 Strike Fighter Squadron 94 (VFA-94) – F/A-18F Super Hornet
 Strike Fighter Squadron 113 (VFA-113) – F/A-18E Super Hornet
 Strike Fighter Squadron 122 (VFA-122) – F/A-18E/F Super Hornet
 Strike Fighter Squadron 136 (VFA-136) – F/A-18E Super Hornet
 Strike Fighter Squadron 137 (VFA-137) – F/A-18E Super Hornet
 Strike Fighter Squadron 146 (VFA-146) – F/A-18E Super Hornet
 Strike Fighter Squadron 151 (VFA-151) – F/A-18E Super Hornet
 Strike Fighter Squadron 154 (VFA-154) – F/A-18F Super Hornet
 Strike Fighter Squadron 192 (VFA-192) – F/A-18E Super Hornet
 Strike Fighter Weapons School Pacific (SFWSP) – T-34C Turbo Mentor

Other tenant activities

Fleet Logistics Center San Diego, Det Lemoore
Fleet Aviation Specialized Operational Training Group, Pacific Fleet
Naval Air Technical Services Facility Detachment
Naval Aviation Engineering Service Unit
Naval Air Maintenance Training Group
Naval Hospital
Naval Branch Dental Clinic
Naval Training Systems Center
Trainer Systems Support Activity
Navy Operational Support Center (formerly Naval Air Reserve Center)
Fleet Readiness Center West
Naval Criminal Investigative Service NCISRA
Naval Legal Service Office, Southwest Branch Office
Aviation Survival Training Center
NATEC, Naval Air Technical Data and Engineering Service Command
NAFC, Naval Aviation Forecast Component
NAMCE, Naval Aviation Maintenance Center for Excellence
MWSS 473 Detachment Alpha, Marine Corps Reserve  Motor transportation company

Educational institutes
 Akers Elementary School (Preschool-8th)
 Neutra Elementary School (K-5)
 Military College

See also 

 List of United States Navy airfields

References

Sources

External links

Installations of the United States Navy in California
NAS Lemoore
NAS Lemoore
Lemoore, Naval Air Station
Military airbases established in 1961
Lemoore, California
1961 establishments in California
NAS Lemoore
NAS Lemoore